Nanaimo District Secondary School or Nanaimo District Community School (NDSS) is a public high school in Nanaimo, British Columbia, Canada built in 1952. Since then there have been a few renovations, most notably the 1981 construction of the "tower", which houses a number of computer classes and several classrooms. The school has a capacity of about 1600 students. The school has a metal workshop, a woodwork shop, seven computer labs, two gymnasiums, a study hall, two cafeterias, an Automotive Shop, Distance Education programs, and the CTC (career and technical center). The school teaches students from grade 8 to grade 12. NDSS is also home to Nanaimo's French Immersion and Francophone programs..

Location 
The school is connected to the Nanaimo Aquatic Centre, and is across the road from the Nanaimo Ice Centre and the baseball diamonds at Serauxmen Fields. It is also adjacent to the Rotary Bowl and Vancouver Island University.

Clubs
DND club, AV Club, Rap Club, Volleyball Team, I.S.C.F., Badminton Club, United Nations Club, Future Teachers, 100 Mile Club, Empathy NDSS, Dramatica,
Wrestling, Senior Girls' Basketball, Boys' Rugby, Broadcast Club, Weight Lifting Club, GSA. The Junior Varsity Islanders won the BC high school Football Subway bowl in 2016 against Harewoods John Barsby Bulldawgs.

References

External links

High schools in British Columbia
Buildings and structures in Nanaimo
Education in Nanaimo
Educational institutions established in 1952
1952 establishments in British Columbia